William Sergio Mejía Castillo (born 21 April 1999) is a Mexican professional footballer who plays as a defensive midfielder.

Career statistics

Club

References

External links
 
 
 
 

1999 births
Living people
Mexican footballers
Association football midfielders
CD Toledo players
Atlético Morelia players
Raya2 Expansión players